Rosa Pastel (English: Pastel Pink) is the third single from Belanova's album Dulce Beat. After the success from Por Ti, Belanova made a re-release of Dulce Beat album named Dulce Beat 2.0, and Universal Records agreed with Belanova, to choose Rosa Pastel to be the single and promotional song from the new edition album.

Track list
Digital Download
Rosa Pastel (Album version) – 3:06

Music video

The music video was directed by Chicle and was filmed in Mexico City. The video ranked on Mtv's Los 10+ Pedidos Latinoamerica #1 for 11 days. It also ranked on the best music videos from 2006 in #11, and #3 just counting Hispanic music videos.

Covers 
This song was covered by Mexican Duranguense band, Los Duros de Durango, on their first recording album "Los Duros de Durango: 12 éxitos en Duranguense".

Charts

References

 Yahoo's Music band's pages
 Official page
 Official fan page
 Fan Made's blogs
 [ Billboard's charts]
 Rosa Pastel's cover
 Rosa Pastel's cover

2006 singles
Belanova songs
Songs written by Denisse Guerrero
Songs written by Edgar Huerta
Songs written by Ricardo Arreola
2005 songs
Universal Music Latino singles